MBC Max (stylized as MBC MAX) is a free-to-air movie channel that broadcasts non-stop Hollywood films and it is an alternative to its sister channel MBC 2.

MBC Max HD was launched on 1 July 2011.

History 
The channel was launched as a test broadcast on 22 October 2008, and during that time it simply showed its own promotional TV ad in a loop. The channel was officially launched on 26 October at 7:00 pm U.A.E. time. Its first film was Spider-Man.

Content
As mentioned earlier, MBC Max shows films with milder content than MBC 2, which means MBC Max may not show horror films and other related genres. The channel does not show any film that contains extreme forms of violence. MBC Max even has slightly more censorship than MBC 2, but mostly with the audio simply to remove the majority of a certain film's bad language, as well as bigger cuts of other censored and sexual scenes.

MBC Max also features MBC 3 prints of animated and family films, always broadcasting in the middle of the afternoon U.A.E. time, as these films feature the same MBC 3-based, higher-level censorship. (This only applies to films that were originally on MBC 3, as the animated and family films that premiered on MBC Max did not feature such censorship, even though many of those films later appeared on MBC 3, unsurprisingly featuring censorship.)

Despite MBC Max's reputation for broadcasting mild films, it does however broadcast certain R-rated films, such as dramas and comedies like Me, Myself & Irene, albeit the audio was heavily edited since the film contained strong language. It is only important that films do not feature extreme visual violence, and sexual themes are mostly censored anyway.

Additionally, MBC Max broadcasts classical films more often than MBC 2, since the majority of Hollywood films from the 1960s and before are considered mild by today's standards.

Programming 
Occasionally, MBC Max would broadcast special film packages giving it a greater specialty value than its sister channel MBC 2.

Shows 
 A-List Lifestyle
 Action Zone
 Al Anisa Farah
 Beauty Match
 Beauty Match: Tahadi Al Fashionista
 Box Office Top 5
 Comedy Movies
 Celebrity Scoop
 Celebrity Scrapbook
 Celebrity Style Story
 Famous Foodies
 Fashion Forward
 Films & Stars
 Hollywood Buzz
 Making the Movies
 Miss Farah
 Must Haves
 Planet Action 
 ReelTalk
 Scoop
 Scoop Box Office
 Scoop Network
 Scoop On Runway
 Scoop On Set
 Scoop with Raya
 StarTalk

Entertainmment 
 Box Office America
 Entertainment Tonight
 The Insider
 Young Hollywood's Greatest...

Drama 
 Atlantis
 Camelot
 Merlin
 Rome
 True Blood
 True Detective

Miniseries 
 Mildred Pierce
 The Night Manager
 Quiz
 Into the West
 Lost in the West

Spanish series 
 Desaparecidos
 El embarcadero
 El ministerio del tiempo
 Hermanos
 La caza
 Madres. Amor y vida
 Presunto culpable
 Pulsaciones
 Secretos de Estado
 Sé quién eres
 Traición
 Unauthorized Living
 Velvet

Spanish-language series 
 La bella y las bestias
 La Piloto

Italian series 
 My Brilliant Friend

Argentine series 
 Lalola

German series 
 Meine Mutter …

Telenovelas 
 Amor Maior
 En tierras salvajes
 La reina soy yo
 Nazaré
 Paixão
 Rainha das Flores
 Terra Brava

Korean dramas 
 The 1st Shop of Coffee Prince
 About Time
 Are You Human?
 At Eighteen
 Beautiful World
 The Beauty Inside
 Big
 Boys Over Flowers
 Cheat on Me If You Can
 Cinderella Man
 Clean with Passion for Now
 Dream High
 Dream High 2
 Fashion King
 Gangnam Beauty
 Heartstrings
 He Is Psychometric
 The Heirs
 Her Private Life
 Hotel Del Luna
 Lawless Lawyer
 Mary Stayed Out All Night
 Master's Sun
 Matrimonial Chaos
 Men Are Men
 Moment of Eighteen
 More Than Friends
 My Fair Lady
 My Princess
 Personal Taste
 Playful Kiss
 The Producers
 Reply 1988
 Reply 1994
 Reply 1997
 Rooftop Prince
 Search: WWW
 Secret Love Affair
 Suspicious Partner
 That Winter, the Wind Blows
 Touch Your Heart
 Welcome
 What's Wrong with Secretary Kim
 When My Love Blooms
 Whisper
 You're Beautiful

Brazilian dramas 
 Além do Tempo
 Amores Roubados
 Caminho das Índias
 Deus Salve o Rei
 Dupla Identidade
 A Fórmula
 Justiça
 Onde Está Meu Coração
 Rock Story
 Sob Pressão
 Sol Nascente
 Totalmente Demais
 Treze Dias Longe do Sol
 Verdades Secretas

Greek dramas 
 To Tatouaz

Films 
 The Amazing Spider-Man
 The Amazing Spider-Man 2
 Baby's Day Out
 Beautiful Creatures
 Big Hero 6
 Brave
 Danny Collins
 Despicable Me
 Despicable Me 2
 Despicable Me 3
 Django Unchained
 Furry Vengeance
 The Hangover
 The Hangover Part II
 The Hangover Part III
 Home Alone
 Home Alone 2: Lost in New York
 Hotel Transylvania
 Ice Age
 Ice Age 2: The Meltdown
 Ice Age 3: Dawn of the Dinosaurs
 Ice Age 4: Continental Drift
 Ice Age 5: Collision Course
 Inside Out
 The Invisible Guest
 It's Now Or Never
 The Lion King
 Madagascar
 Madagascar 2
 Madagascar 3
 Me, Myself & Irene
 Minions
 Mr. Holmes
 Muppets From Space
 Penguins of Madagascar
 Pitch Perfect
 The Polar Express
 Ralph Breaks the Internet
 Spider-Man
 Spider-Man 2
 Spider-Man 3
 Spider-Man: Far From Home
 Spider-Man: Homecoming
 Storks
 Totally Spies! The Movie
 Wreck-It Ralph
 Zootopia

Logos and indents

Logos

See also
 MBC Group

References

External links

Television stations in the United Arab Emirates
Television stations in Saudi Arabia
Arab mass media
Arabic-language television stations
Free-to-air
Movie channels
Television channels and stations established in 2008
Middle East Broadcasting Center